Chrysa is the western quarter of the town Xanthi, in northern Greece. It was originally built as a settlement for refugees after the Greco-Turkish War (1919–1922).

Populated places in Xanthi (regional unit)